Richard Stanley Gotfried (born September 18, 1958) is a Canadian politician who was elected in the 2019 Alberta General Election to the 30th Alberta Legislature, representing the electoral district of Calgary-Fish Creek for the United Conservative Party. He was re-elected to the riding with a voting plurality of 8,499, and has served the Fish Creek constituency as a Member of the Legislative Assembly (MLA) since the 2015 Alberta General Election. Prior to 2015, his seat was held by Heather Forsyth, who had served as the Leader of the Opposition before retiring from politics after the 2015 election was called.

Electoral history

2019 General Election

2015 General Election

References

1958 births
Living people
Politicians from Calgary
Progressive Conservative Association of Alberta MLAs
United Conservative Party MLAs
21st-century Canadian politicians
Jewish Canadian politicians
Canadian people of Jewish descent